Juha Kivi (born 26 January 1964 in Orivesi) is a retired Finnish long jumper.

He became Finnish champion in 1989 and 1993.

His personal best jump was 8.02 metres, achieved in August 1989 in Tampere.

Achievements

References

1964 births
Living people
People from Orivesi
Finnish male long jumpers
Sportspeople from Pirkanmaa